The 2001 BYU Cougars football team represented Brigham Young University during the 2001 NCAA Division I-A football season.  This was the first BYU team without LaVell Edwards as the head coach in 30 years.

Schedule

•SportsWest Productions (SWP) games were shown locally on KSL 5.

Roster

Game summaries

Tulane

Nevada

California

Source:

UNLV

Utah State

Source:

New Mexico

Source:

Air Force

San Diego State

Source:

Colorado State

Wyoming

Source:

Utah

Source:

Mississippi State

Source:

Hawai'i

Source:

Louisville

Source:

References

BYU
BYU Cougars football seasons
Mountain West Conference football champion seasons
BYU Cougars football